Neodythemis afra is a species of dragonfly in the family Libellulidae. It is found in Cameroon, Central African Republic, the Republic of the Congo, the Democratic Republic of the Congo, Nigeria, and Uganda. Its natural habitat is subtropical or tropical moist lowland forests.

References

Libellulidae
Odonata of Africa
Fauna of Central Africa
Insects of the Democratic Republic of the Congo
Insects of the Republic of the Congo
Insects of West Africa
Insects of Uganda
Least concern biota of Africa
Taxonomy articles created by Polbot
Insects described in 1909